Duncan Grant (born 7 February 1980) is a New Zealand rower.

Grant was born in Ashburton in 1980. Throughout his rowing career, he has competed in the lightweight men's single sculls category. At the 2006 World Rowing Championships in Eton, he won a bronze medal. He was lightweight men's single sculls world champion on three occasions: at the championships in 2007 in Munich, in 2008 in Ottensheim, and in 2009 in Poznań. When the world championships were held in his home town at Lake Karapiro in 2010, he missed the A-final and came first in the B-final. At the 2011 World Rowing Championships at Lake Bled, he won a bronze medal.

In February 2011, Peter Taylor became New Zealand national champion in lightweight men's single sculls, beating Grant in an upset win.

He was a mathematics teacher at Auckland Grammar School from May 2018 to December 2018.

References

1980 births
Living people
New Zealand male rowers
Sportspeople from Ashburton, New Zealand
World Rowing Championships medalists for New Zealand
21st-century New Zealand people